M*A*S*H (stylized on-screen as MASH) is a 1970 American black comedy war film directed by Robert Altman and written by Ring Lardner Jr., based on Richard Hooker's 1968 novel MASH: A Novel About Three Army Doctors. The picture is the only theatrically released feature film in the M*A*S*H franchise, and it became one of the biggest films of the early 1970s for 20th Century Fox.

The film depicts a unit of medical personnel stationed at a Mobile Army Surgical Hospital (MASH) during the Korean War. It stars Donald Sutherland, Tom Skerritt, and Elliott Gould, with Sally Kellerman, Robert Duvall, René Auberjonois, Gary Burghoff, Roger Bowen, Michael Murphy, and in his film debut, professional football player Fred Williamson. Although the Korean War is the film's storyline setting, the subtext is the Vietnam War – a current event at the time the film was made. Doonesbury creator Garry Trudeau, who saw the film in college, said M*A*S*H was "perfect for the times, the cacophony of American culture was brilliantly reproduced onscreen".

The film won the Grand Prix du Festival International du Film, later named the Palme d'Or, at the 1970 Cannes Film Festival. The film went on to receive five Academy Award nominations, including Best Picture, and won for Best Adapted Screenplay. In 1996, M*A*S*H was included in the annual selection of 25 motion pictures added to the National Film Registry of the Library of Congress being deemed "culturally, historically, or aesthetically significant" and recommended for preservation. The Academy Film Archive preserved M*A*S*H in 2000.

The film inspired the television series M*A*S*H, which ran from 1972 to 1983. Gary Burghoff, who played Radar O'Reilly, was the only actor playing a major character who appeared in both the movie and the TV series. Altman despised the TV series, calling it "the antithesis of what we were trying to do" with the movie.

Plot
In 1951, the 4077th Mobile Army Surgical Hospital in South Korea is assigned two new surgeons, "Hawkeye" Pierce and "Duke" Forrest, who arrive in a stolen Army Jeep. They are insubordinate, womanizing, mischievous rule-breakers, but they soon prove to be excellent combat surgeons. Other characters already stationed at the camp include bumbling commanding officer Henry Blake, his hyper-competent chief clerk Radar O'Reilly, dentist Walter "Painless Pole" Waldowski, the incompetent and pompous surgeon Frank Burns, and the contemplative Chaplain Father Mulcahy.

The main characters in the camp divide into two factions. Irritated by Frank's religious fervor, Hawkeye and Duke get Blake to move him to another tent so newly arrived chest surgeon Trapper John McIntyre can move in. The three doctors (the "Swampmen", after the nickname for their tent) have little respect for military protocol, having been drafted into the Army, and are prone to pranks, womanizing, and heavy drinking. Frank is a straitlaced military officer who wants everything done efficiently and by the book, as is Margaret Houlihan, who has been assigned to the 4077th as head nurse. The two bond over their respect for regulations and start a secret romance. With help from Radar, the Swampmen sneak a microphone into a tent where the couple are making love and broadcast their passion over the camp's PA system, embarrassing them badly and earning Houlihan the nickname "Hot Lips." The next morning, Hawkeye goads Frank into assaulting him, resulting in the latter's removal from the camp for psychiatric evaluation. Later, when Hot Lips is showering, the Swampmen prank her by pulling the tent sides off and exposing her naked body, in order to settle a bet over whether or not she is a natural blonde. Furious and embarrassed, Hot Lips screams at Blake for letting his staff run wild and failing to discipline them.

Painless, described as "the best-equipped dentist in the Army" and "the dental Don Juan of Detroit," becomes depressed over an incident of impotence and announces his intent to commit suicide, believing that he has turned homosexual. The Swampmen agree to help him carry out the deed, staging a feast to evoke Leonardo da Vinci's Last Supper, arranging for Father Mulcahy to give Painless absolution and communion, and providing him with a "black capsule" (actually a sleeping pill) to speed him on his way. Hawkeye persuades the gorgeous Lieutenant "Dish" Schneider—who has remained faithful to her husband and is being transferred back to the United States for discharge—to spend the night with Painless and allay his concern about his "latent homosexuality". The next morning, Painless is his usual cheerful self, and a smiling Dish leaves camp in a helicopter to start her journey home.

Trapper and Hawkeye are sent to Japan on temporary duty to operate on a Congressman's son and hopefully, play some golf. When they later perform an unauthorized operation on a local infant, they face disciplinary action from the hospital commander for misusing Army resources. Trapper uses Anesthetic gas to sedate the commander. Using staged photographs of him as he awakens in bed with a prostitute, they blackmail him into keeping his mouth shut.

Following their return to camp, Blake and General Hammond organize a football game between the 4077th and the 325th Evac Hospital and wager several thousand dollars on its outcome. At Hawkeye's suggestion, Blake applies to have a specific neurosurgeon – Dr. Oliver Harmon "Spearchucker" Jones, a former professional football player for the San Francisco 49ers – transferred to the 4077th as a ringer. Hawkeye also suggests that Blake bet half his money up front and keep Jones out of the first half of the game. The 325th scores repeatedly and easily, even after the 4077th drugs one of their star players to incapacitate him. Hammond confidently offers high odds, against which Blake bets the rest of his money. Jones enters the second half, which quickly devolves into a free-for-all, and the 4077th gets the 325th's second ringer thrown out of the game and wins with a final trick play.

Not long after the football game, Hawkeye and Duke get their discharge orders and begin their journey home – taking the same stolen Jeep in which they arrived.

Cast

Production

Development and writing
The screenplay, by Ring Lardner Jr., is different from Hooker's original novel. In the DVD audio commentary, Altman describes the novel as "pretty terrible" and somewhat "racist" (the only major black character has the nickname "Spearchucker"). He claims that the screenplay was used only as a springboard. Despite this assertion by Altman, however, while some improvisation occurs in the film and Altman changed the order of major sequence, most sequences are in the novel. The main deletion is a subplot of Ho-Jon's return to the 4077th as a casualty (when Radar steals blood from Henry, it is for Ho-Jon's operation under Trapper and Hawkeye's scalpels; when the surgeons are playing poker after the football game, they are resolutely ignoring Ho-Jon's corpse being driven away). The main deviation from the script is the trimming of much of the dialogue.

In his director's commentary, Altman says that M*A*S*H was the first major studio film to use the word "fuck" in its dialogue. The word is spoken during the football game near the end of the film by Walt "Painless Pole" Waldowski when he says to an opposing football player, "All right, Bud, your fucking head is coming right off!" The actor, John Schuck, said in an interview that Andy Sidaris, who was handling the football sequences, encouraged Schuck to "say something that'll annoy him." Schuck did so, and that particular statement made it into the film without a second thought. Previously confined to cult and "underground" films, its use in a film as conventionally screened and professionally distributed as M*A*S*H marked the dawn of a new era of social acceptability for profanity on the big screen, which had until a short time before this film's release been forbidden outright for any major studio picture in the United States under the Hays Code.

Although a number of sources have reported that Lardner was upset with the liberties taken with his script,
 he denied it in his autobiography: "[...] But the departures weren't as drastic as he [Altman] made out; much of the improvisation involved a couple of scenes between Donald Sutherland and Elliott Gould in which they rephrased lines in their own words. [...] For all of Bob's interpolations and improvisations, however, the basic structure of the movie is the one laid out in my script, and each scene has the beginning, middle, end that I gave it."

Filming and production
Altman, relatively new to the filmmaking establishment at that time, lacked the credentials to justify his unorthodox filmmaking process and had a history of turning down work rather than creating a poor-quality product. Altman: "I had practice working for people who don't care about quality, and I learned how to sneak it in." "Twentieth Century Fox had two other wars going on, Patton and Tora! Tora! Tora!" Altman remembered.  "Those were big-budget pictures, and we were cheap.  I knew that if I stayed under budget and didn't cause too much trouble, we could sneak through."

The filming process was difficult because of tensions between the director and his cast. During principal photography, Sutherland and Gould allegedly spent a third of their time trying to get Altman fired, although this has been disputed. Altman later commented that if he had known about Gould and Sutherland's protests, he would have resigned. Gould later sent a letter of apology, and Altman used him in a number of his later works – including The Long Goodbye, California Split, Nashville, and The Player – but Altman never worked with Sutherland again.

Because of the context of the film being made – during the height of America's involvement in the Vietnam War – 20th Century Fox was concerned that audiences would not understand that it was ostensibly taking place during the Korean War. At the request of the studio, a caption that mentions the Korean setting was added to the beginning of the film, and PA announcements throughout the film served the same purpose. Only a few loudspeaker announcements were used in the original cut. When Altman realized he needed more structure to his largely episodic film, editor Danford Greene suggested using more loudspeaker announcements to frame different episodes of the story. Greene took a second-unit crew and filmed additional shots of the speakers. On the same night these scenes were shot, American astronauts landed on the moon. The Korean War is explicitly referenced in announcements on the camp public address system and during a radio announcement that plays while Hawkeye and Trapper are putting in Col. Merrill's office, which also cites the film as taking place in 1951.

Music

Soundtrack music
Johnny Mandel composed incidental music used throughout the film. Also heard on the soundtrack are Japanese vocal renditions of such songs as "Tokyo Shoe Shine Boy", "My Blue Heaven", "Happy Days Are Here Again", "Chattanooga Choo Choo", and "Hi-Lili, Hi-Lo"; impromptu performances of "Onward, Christian Soldiers", "When the Lights Go On Again", and "Hail to the Chief" by cast members; and the instrumental "Washington Post March" during the climactic football game.

M*A*S*H features the song "Suicide Is Painless", with music by Mandel and lyrics by Mike Altman, the director's then 14-year-old son. The version heard under the opening credits was sung by uncredited session vocalists John Bahler, Tom Bahler, Ron Hicklin, and Ian Freebairn-Smith; on the single release, the song is attributed to "The Mash". The song is reprised later in the film by Pvt. Seidman (played by Ken Prymus) in the scene in which Painless attempts to commit suicide.

Soundtrack album
Columbia Masterworks issued a soundtrack album of the film in 1970 (all songs by Johnny Mandel unless otherwise noted):
 "Suicide Is Painless (Michael Altman, lyrics and Johnny Mandel, music)"
 "Duke and Hawkeye Arrive at M.A.S.H."
 "The Operating Theater" / "Happy Days Are Here Again"
 "Major Houlihan and Major Burns"
 "Painless Suicide, Funeral, and Resurrection"
 "'Hot Lips' Shows Her True Colors" / "Chattanooga Choo Choo"
 "Moments to Remember" / "Happy Days Are Here Again"
 "The Football Game"
 "Going Home" / "Happy Days Are Here Again"
 "M.A.S.H. Theme (Instrumental)" by Ahmad Jamal
 "Dedication Scroll" / "Jeep Ride"
 "The Jig’s Up"
 "To Japan"
 "Japanese Children's Hospital"
 "Tent Scene"
 "Kill ’Em, Galop"

Release

Home media
M*A*S*H received its first home video release in 1977 on both VHS and Betamax. This 1977 release of the film was the original, unedited version and was one of the first 50 titles released to home video by Magnetic Video Corporation (M*A*S*H was number #38).

Ster-Kinekor Video and Fox Video released the film with 20th Century Fox, which was released in 1992 in South Africa.

In the 1990’s, Fox Video re-released a VHS version of the film as part of its "Selections" banner, which ran 116 minutes and was rated PG. However, this is not the alternate PG version that was released in 1973. It has the same run-time as the theatrical release; none of the aforementioned scenes or theme music was removed. The actual 1973 PG-edited version has never been issued on home video in the United States. It was released on DVD on January 8, 2002.

Reception

Box office
M*A*S*H was a box-office hit; it was the third highest-grossing film released in 1970 (behind Love Story and Airport). The film opened January 25, 1970, at the Baronet Theatre in New York City and grossed $37,143 in its first week. According to 20th Century Fox records the film required $6,550,000 in rentals to break even, and by 11 December 1970 had made $31,225,000, thus making a profit for the studio. Ultimately, the film made $81.6 million against a budget of $3.025 million.

It was the sixth most popular film at the French box office in 1970.

The film was re-released to theaters in North America in late 1973. To attract audiences to the M*A*S*H television series, which had struggled in the ratings in its first season, 20th Century Fox reissued the film in a version running 112 minutes and bearing a PG rating. Some of the more explicit content from the original R-rated cut was edited out, including segments of graphic surgical operations, Hot Lips' shower scene, and the use of the word fuck during the football game. According to film critic and historian Leonard Maltin, the film's main theme song, "Suicide is Painless", was replaced with music by Ahmad Jamal. The re-release earned an estimated $3.5 million at the box office.

Critical response
M*A*S*H received mostly positive reviews from critics. The film holds an 84% approval rating on Rotten Tomatoes, based on 56 reviews, with an average rating of 8.30/10. The website's consensus states, "Bold, timely, subversive, and above all, funny, M*A*S*H remains a high point in Robert Altman's distinguished filmography." The film also holds a score of 80 out of 100 on Metacritic, based on 8 critics, indicating "generally favorable reviews".

In a rave review, John Mahoney of The Hollywood Reporter called the film "the finest American comedy since Some Like It Hot", and "the Mister Roberts of the Korean War", as well as "The Graduate of 1970". Time magazine, in a review titled "Catch-22 Caliber", wrote of the film, "though it wears a dozen manic, libidinous masks, none quite covers the face of dread... M.A.S.H., one of America's funniest bloody films, is also one of its bloodiest funny films." The New Yorker critic Pauline Kael wrote of the film, "I don't know when I’ve had such a good time at a movie. Many of the best recent American movies leave you feeling that there's nothing to do but get stoned and die, that that's your proper fate as an American. This movie heals a breach." John Simon described M*A*S*H as an 'amusingly absurdist army satire'.

Roger Ebert, in the Chicago Sun-Times, gave the film four (out of four) stars, writing,

In contrast, Roger Greenspun of The New York Times wrote of M*A*S*H, "To my knowledge [it] is the first major American movie openly to ridicule belief in God – not phony belief; real belief. It is also one of the few (though by no means the first) American screen comedies openly to admit the cruelty of its humor. And it is at pains to blend that humor with more operating room gore than I have ever seen in any movie from any place... Although it is impudent, bold, and often very funny, it lacks the sense of order (even in the midst of disorder) that seems the special province of successful comedy."

In a retrospective review for the Chicago Reader, Jonathan Rosenbaum noted that "the film... helped launch the careers of Elliott Gould, Donald Sutherland, Sally Kellerman, Robert Duvall, and subsequent Altman regulars Rene Auberjonois and John Schuck, and won screenwriter Ring Lardner Jr. an Oscar." Rosenbaum characterized the film as "a somewhat adolescent if stylish antiauthoritarian romp... But the misogyny and cruelty behind many of the gags are as striking as the black comedy and the original use of overlapping dialogue. This is still watchable for the verve of the ensemble acting and dovetailing direction, but some of the crassness leaves a sour aftertaste." Writing in The Guardian for the film's 50th anniversary, Noah Gittell also criticized it for having "a deep and unexamined misogyny", noting that the treatment of the Houlihan character in particular anticipated such later teen sex comedies as Animal House, Porky's, and Revenge of the Nerds.

The Japanese filmmaker Akira Kurosawa cited this movie as one of his 100 favorite films.

Accolades

In 1996, M*A*S*H was deemed "culturally significant" by the Library of Congress and was selected for preservation in the United States National Film Registry.

Year-end lists
The film is number 17 on Bravo's "100 Funniest Movies" and number 54 on "AFI" list of the top 100 American movies of all time.

American Film Institute
 1998: AFI's 100 Years...100 Movies – #56
 2000: AFI's 100 Years...100 Laughs – #7
 2004: AFI's 100 Years...100 Songs:
 "Suicide Is Painless" – #66
 2007: AFI's 100 Years...100 Movies (10th Anniversary Edition) – #54

See also
 List of American films of 1970
 Battle Circus, a 1953 Humphrey Bogart film, also set in a Korean War MASH unit

References
Informational notes

Citations

Further reading
 Eagan, Daniel (2010) America's Film Legacy: The Authoritative Guide to the Landmark Movies in the National Film Registry, Bloomsbury Academic. pp. 659–660.

External links

 
 
 
 
 
 
 
 Elliott Gould remembers M*A*S*H, from the BBC website; in RealMedia

Film
1970 films
1970s black comedy films
1970s war comedy-drama films
20th Century Fox films
American black comedy films
American football films
American satirical films
American war comedy-drama films
Anti-war comedy films
Best Musical or Comedy Picture Golden Globe winners
1970s English-language films
Films adapted into television shows
Films scored by Johnny Mandel
Films based on American novels
Films directed by Robert Altman
Films set in 1951
Films whose writer won the Best Adapted Screenplay Academy Award
Korean War films
Medical-themed films
Military humor in film
Palme d'Or winners
Films with screenplays by Ring Lardner Jr.
M*A*S*H film
United States National Film Registry films
1970s political films
1970 comedy films
1970 drama films
National Society of Film Critics Award for Best Film winners
Films set in hospitals
Films about the United States Army
Films set in South Korea
Films set in Japan
Films shot in California
1970s American films